Bahria may refer to:

Several establishments of the Pakistan Navy
Bahria Foundation
Bahria University
Bahria Schools and Colleges

Bahria Town, private real-estate company

See also 

 Bharia (disambiguation)
 Bahr (disambiguation)
 Bahr (toponymy), a component of Arabic placenames meaning "sea" or "large river"

Bahri, Arabic name